Keith Eric Cook (4 December 1922 – 16 May 1971) was an Australian rules footballer who played with Richmond in the Victorian Football League (VFL).

Cook was Richmond's reserve in the 1944 VFL Grand Final and replaced injured player Les Jones at half-time. Also in the team that day was Fred Cook, his identical twin brother.

In 1947, Cook was cleared to Camberwell.

He served with the Royal Australian Air Force in World War II.

References

External links
Tigerland Archive

1922 births
1971 deaths
Australian rules footballers from Melbourne
Richmond Football Club players
Camberwell Football Club players
Royal Australian Air Force personnel of World War II
Australian twins
Twin sportspeople
Identical twins
Royal Australian Air Force airmen
Military personnel from Melbourne
People from Croydon, Victoria